Farm to Market Roads in Texas are owned and maintained by the Texas Department of Transportation (TxDOT).

FM 400

FM 401

Farm to Market Road 401 (FM 401) is located in and around Childress. It runs  and is located in Childress County. It begins at an intersection with US 287 (Avenue F) and 7th Street in downtown Childress, heads north along 7th Street to a T-intersection with FM 3181 north of the city. The highway was designated on November 26, 1969.

FM 401 (1945–1964)

The first incarnation of FM 401 existed in Lubbock and Hale counties. On July 9, it was extended north into Hale County to FM 54. It followed this routing until August 20, 1964, when the entire road was transferred to FM 179.

FM 402

Farm to Market Road 402 (FM 402) is a  route in Terry County. The highway reaches the settlement of Johnson before curving to the east at FM 3262 and then curving back to the north to reach its terminus at FM 303.

On December 16, 1948, the road was extended south to a point west of Wellman which is now the road's current southern terminus. However, on February 24, 1953, FM 300 would take over the northernmost  of FM 402 leading to the configuration that FM 402 follows today. This section of FM 300 was renumbered FM 303 on February 10, 1966.

FM 403

Farm to Market Road 403 (FM 403) is located in Gaines and Terry counties in western Texas. The  highway begins at an intersection with SH 83 and County Road 664 in northeastern Gaines County and travels north through the county for  before making an S curve to the west where it enters Terry County. The highway makes another S curve to the west before intersecting FM 213 and passing through the community of Foster before ending on the city limit line of Brownfield at an intersection with US 62/US 385 and SH 137.

The road was extended south to the Gaines–Terry county line on July 20, 1948, and to its current southern terminus on June 21, 1951.

FM 404

Farm to Market Road 404 (FM 404) existed from 1945 to 1990 in southeastern Texas. The southern terminus of the road had always been in Green Lake at SH 35. From the time of its designation on June 12, 1945, until July 9 of the same year, its northern terminus was at the Calhoun–Victoria county line (with the road being entirely in Calhoun County). On July 9, the road was extended north through Bloomington and Pleasant Valley to the city of Victoria at US 87. On October 16, 1951, FM 404 began being signed (but not designated) as an extension of SH 185. On August 29, 1990, the entire route was officially designated as SH 185, and FM 404 was cancelled.

FM 405

Farm to Market Road 405 (FM 405) is a  route in Walker County. The road's southern terminus is at US 190 near the community of Dodge and within the confines of the Sam Houston National Forest. The route heads north through unincorporated lands (mostly pine forests) before ending in the city of Riverside at SH 19. It was created on June 11, 1945.

FM 406

Farm to Market Road 406 (FM 406) is a  route running from SH 289 in the community of Fink to FM 84 in northern Grayson County, just south of Lake Texoma and the Oklahoma state line. The designation was assigned on October 26, 1983, between FM 120 in Fink to FM 84, similar to how it runs today (but at a total length of ).

FM 406 (1945–1962)

The first FM 406 existed from 1945 until 1962. It was a north-south road located in Orange County west of Orange. At the time of its designation on June 11, 1945, it traveled from SH 87 to the community of Peveto. This extension was formerly FM 1137. On September 29, 1954, the road was extended northeast to FM 1130. On April 27, 1955, the highway from Peveto to FM 1130 was redesignated as FM 1078. The entire route was deleted on May 1, 1962, when it was replaced by SH 62.

FM 407

Farm to Market Road 407 (FM 407) is located in Wise and Denton counties. It runs from US 81/US 287 in New Fairview to I-35E/US 77 in Lewisville. There is a brief concurrency with FM 156.

FM 407 (1945)

The first FM 407 was designated on June 11, 1945, from Orange north . FM 407 was cancelled on December 10, 1946, as it became part of rerouted SH 87. The old route of SH 87 became FM 1559 upon completion, but this was transferred to FM 1130 in 1950, and removed from the state highway system on June 27, 1962.

FM 408

Farm to Market Road 408 (FM 408) is a  route in Orange County, connecting Bridge City at FM 1442 (Roundbunch Road) to Orangefield at FM 105 (Orangefield Road). The highway begins at its south end along Miller Drive and travels due north. After exiting the city limits, the road makes a reverse curve to the west and resumes traveling north. It travels through the center of Orangefield before it ends at FM 105 which is within the city limits of Orange.

FM 408 was designated on June 11, 1945, from SH 87 (now SH 73, SH 87, and Texas Avenue) in Bridge City, west along Roundbunch Road, and then along its current routing to Orangefield, ending just south of its current terminus. In the 1940s, the route was proposed to be signed as a state highway, but was redesignated back to a FM route. It was extended north on January 12, 1966, due to the relocation of FM 105, and truncated to its current southern terminus on September 13, 1987, with FM 1442 replacing the deleted section.

FM 409

Farm to Market Road 409 (FM 409) is a designation that has been used four times.

FM 409 was designated on March 16, 1982, from FM 2029 to Bois D' Arc Creek. The road extended to FM 100 on September 22, 1982.

FM 409 (1945–1953)

The first use of the FM 409 designation was in Orange County, from SH 87 west to FM 408 at Orangefield. FM 409 was cancelled on January 29, 1953, and transferred to FM 105. Note that FM 409 used Cormier Road east of FM 408, because the current route of FM 105 to the north was not built.

FM 409

The second use of the FM 409 designation was in Briscoe County, from FM 598, 4.3 miles north of the Floyd County line, west to the Swisher County line. However, FM 145 extended eastward to the Swisher–Briscoe county line that same day. On November 1, 1954, FM 409 was to become part of FM 145 when construction on the FM 145 extension and on FM 409 was complete, which happened on October 1, 1955.

FM 409 (1956–1977)

The third use of the FM 409 designation was in Potter and Randall counties, from the south city limit of Amarillo along Bell Street south to US 60/US 87. FM 409 was cancelled on September 29, 1977, and removed from the highway system.

FM 410

Farm to Market Road 410 (FM 410) is a  route located in Red River County. The two-lane road mainly travels through rural, barren lands of northeastern Texas except where it passes through the city of Detroit. It begins in the southwestern corner of the county at FM 196. It travels north coming to a  concurrency with US 271 between Deport and Bogata. FM 410 continues north intersecting some local and other farm to market roads before it enters Detroit. Through this city, FM 410 carries the name 1st Street and also intersects US 82. Near the northern city limits, the road passes the Detroit High School. As it approaches the river and the Oklahoma border, FM 410 begins to curve to the east and later towards the southeast. The highway ends at FM 195 near the community of Blakeney.

When the road was created on June 22, 1945, the road only traveled from US 82 in Detroit to Kanawha, north of Woodland. The road extended south  to FM 411 near Fulbright and north  miles to West Scrap (now known as Kiomatia). After taking over the north-south section of FM 411 from Fulbright to US 271 on January 16, 1953, the road was extended further south to Morris Chapel on October 26, 1954. On May 2, 1962, FM 410 was extended from West Scrap to FM 862. On May 24, 1962, the road was extended to the easternmost intersection with FM 195, replacing FM 862. The final extension occurred in September 1968 when its southern terminus was moved  to the south and west to end at FM 196.

Junction list

FM 411

In addition, it provides access to the community of Fulbright. Except for the area around Fulbright at FM 411's intersection at County Road 1240, the road travels through sparse rural areas throughout its entire length.

At the time of its first designation on June 22, 1945, FM 411 traveled a much longer distance than it does today. It traveled from US 271 east of Deport and headed north along what is now FM 410, then traveled east along its current routing, finally heading northeast towards Clarksville along what is now SH 37. At one point, this entire route was designated as a State Highway; it is unknown if the road was ever signed as such. On March 30, 1952, SH 37 was designated on its current alignment leaving FM 411 to only run from US 271 to SH 37. On January 16, 1953, FM 410 had taken over the north-south portion of the road leaving FM 411 along its current alignment.

FM 412

Farm to Market Road 412 (FM 412) is a  route in Red River County. It runs from the community of Boxelder at FM 44 to the west and north to US 82 just east of Clarksville. The road travels through mostly ranch areas with some wooded areas near its southern end. The designation was assigned on June 22, 1945, as a spur from US 82 to the ranch settlement of Petersburg. It was extended three times: southward  on July 22, 1949, south  on October 31, 1957, and east  on June 28, 1963.

FM 413

Farm to Market Road 413 (FM 413) runs from Rosebud, Falls County to Kosse, Limestone County by way of Reagan. The highway begins just outside the eastern Rosebud city limits at Loop 265 heading southeast briefly but soon curves to the northeast. In Wilderville, there is a brief  concurrency with FM 2027. After crossing the Brazos River, there is an intersection with FM 1373 and it passes through the community of Highbank. In Highbank, there is a  spur road of FM 413 following a former alignment of the main road. The road continues northeast to Reagan where there is an interchange with the southbound lanes of SH 6. Access to and from SH 6 northbound is provided through the original alignment of SH 6 in Reagan. After intersecting three more minor farm to market roads in Falls County, the highway enters Limestone County and ends at SH 14 in the city of Kosse.

The highway was first designated on June 30, 1945, running from Highbank to Reagan. On November 23, 1948, it was extended northeast to Kosse. It would undergo two extensions in the 1950s: on June 23, 1953, to Wilderville and on November 21, 1956, to Rosebud. Minor realignments have occurred since then.

Junction list

FM 414

Farm to Market Road 414 (FM 414) is a  spur road of SH 87 in Shelby County. The heads east from its western terminus at SH 87 at a point between Center and Shelbyville to the community of Campi School just outside the Sabine National Forest border. The road was designated on June 11, 1945, along all of its current route (though the western terminus's cross road was US 96 at the time).

FM 415

Farm to Market Road 415 (FM 415) is a  route connecting FM 138 in Stockman to SH 87 just south of Timpson, in western Shelby County.

FM 415 was designated on June 11, 1945, on the current route.

FM 416

Farm to Market Road 416 (FM 416) is a  route in Freestone and Navarro counties generally following the southern shoreline of the Richland-Chambers Reservoir. The road begins at the intersection of SH 75 and Runnells Street on the border of Streetman, Freestone County and heads north almost immediately entering Navarro County. The road soon curves to the east where it intersects numerous access roads to the reservoir. After passing through the community of Winkler, it heads back into Freestone County and passes through an unnamed settlement featuring numerous businesses, churches, and ranch homes. FM 416 ends at an intersection with FM 488 just south of the reservoir's dam. The designation was applied on September 10, 1968, by replacing a portion of FM 246.

FM 416 (1945–1966)

The first FM 416 existed in the area of Paxton, Shelby County from June 11, 1945, to August 31, 1966. The designation was deleted upon the overlay of FM 699 on September 9, 1966, when it was extended north from its former terminus.

FM 417

Farm to Market Road 417 (FM 417) is a  route in Shelby County running from US 96 near the community of Choice to FM 139 in the town of Huxley within the confines of the Sabine National Forest. The highway travels east from its western terminus for about  before turning north at FM 2140. After heading through a reverse curve featuring a grade crossing with the Timber Rock Railroad, FM 417 heads north and northeast through a mix of forest and ranch lands. It intersects FM 2975 at its northern terminus before continuing to Shelbyville. In Shelbyville, there is a  concurrency with SH 87. Continuing east from the end of the concurrency, FM 417 intersects FM 2694 at the latter's western terminus and enters Sabine National Forest upon crossing the Beauchamp Creek. Though within a national forest, most of the southern side of the road features small ranches. The road enters the town limits of Huxley, a town whose borders generally follow local roads, then ends at FM 139 less than a mile from Toledo Bend Reservoir.

On April 28, 1950, FM 417 was shortened by 0.4 miles as it was rerouted toward Choice. On October 29, 1953, FM 417 was extended southwest to US 96. This configuration would last until August 13, 1968, when FM 417 took over all of FM 1820 northeast of Shelbyville.

FM 418

Farm to Market Road 418 (FM 418) is a  route located in Hardin County. The road begins at the intersection of 5th Street and U.S. Highways 69 and 287 in Kountze. After passing through a residential neighborhood of Kountze, the road heads east through more rural areas of the county crossing the Village Creek. Following the crossing of the creek, it enters the community of Reeves containing a mix of residences and ranches. It also intersects FM 1122 in the community. Now traveling in a southeasterly direction, FM 418 enters the city of Silsbee passing through its northern reaches. Northeast of the city center, the road intersects FM 92 at North 5th Street. The road heads through a wooded area still within the city limits as it curves to the south and ends at an intersection with US 96 Bus.

On August 1. 1947, the road was shortened to a length of  traveling along its current route today starting at US 69/US 287. On March 21, 1950, the road was extended across Village Creek through Reeves to end at FM 92 in Silsbee, replacing FM 419. The last change to the road occurred on June 1, 1965, when FM 418 was extended from FM 92 to what is now its eastern terminus, the cross road then being US 96.

FM 419

Farm to Market Road 419 (FM 419) is located in Nolan and Fisher counties. It runs on a zigzagging route from BL I-20 and Bus. SH 70 (formerly US 80) in Sweetwater to US 180 in Roby.

FM 419 (1945)

The first FM 419 was designated on June 13, 1945, from Silsbee northwest to Reeves. FM 419 was cancelled on March 21, 1950, and combined with FM 418.

FM 420

Farm to Market Road 420 (FM 420) is a  spur road from U.S. Highways 69 and 287 east to the unincorporated community of McKinney in northern Hardin County. Starting at the pair of U.S. Highways between Kountze and Village Mills, the road heads east passing the visitors center for the Big Thicket National Preserve and a pair of RV parks. It winds its way east with the preserve being located on the north side of the road before it ends in a small clearing where some houses and a cemetery are located, the community of McKinney. State maintenance and the FM 420 designation ends at the intersection of McNeely Road and Jordan Road.

FM 420 was designated on June 13, 1945, on the current route.

FM 421

Farm to Market Road 421 (FM 421) is a  route in Hardin County. Its western terminus is at SH 326 near Sour Lake. It passes through the communities of Pine Ridge and Ariola before reaching Lumberton, where it intersects US 69/US 287. Its eastern terminus is at US 96 in Lumberton.

On November 23, 1948, the designation was extended to SH 326. It was extended to SH 326 again on December 17, 1952. The designation was extended a short distance to the east on July 11, 1968, when it was routed along Country Lane Drive to US 96. The easternmost  segment of the highway was transferred to Urban Road 421 (UR 421) on June 27, 1995. The designation of that section reverted to FM 421 with the elimination of the Urban Road system on November 15, 2018.

FM 422

Farm to Market Road 422 (FM 422) is a  route in Baylor and Archer counties in Central Texas. Beginning in the city of Seymour at an intersection which includes U.S. Highway 82, U.S. Business Highways 183, 277, and 283 in addition to SH 114, FM 422 heads east along California Street before performing a reverse curve to the north where it transitions to Archer Road. Just outside the city limits, there is an interchange with the freeway-grade road carrying U.S. Highways 183, 277, and 283. East of the interchange, the road heads through the barren lands of this part of the state. Before passing through the settlement of England, FM 422 has a  concurrency with FM 1170. Beyond England, the land through which the road passes becomes more sparse with only a few oil fields and ranches dotting the roadway.

On October 31, 1957, the road was extended east to its present eastern terminus at FM 210. This configuration lasted until a road realignment was completed in Seymour on May 28, 2015. Before the realignment, FM 422 began at Main Street and traveled east along Nevada Street. The road then turned to the north at Stadium Drive in front of the Seymour Middle School and traveled four blocks before turning right onto Archer Road and continuing as it does today. Upon the completion of the realignment which allows traffic to head directly to Main Street without passing through 90 degree bends, the former roads' jurisdiction was transferred to the city.

FM 423

FM 424

Farm to Market Road 424 (FM 424) is located in Denton County.

FM 424 serves as a connector route that begins at US 380 in Cross Roads; the right-of-way also continues southward from this point as Naylor Road, which travels into Oak Point. The route runs northward for approximately  before ending at US 377 south of Krugerville.

FM 424 was first designated on July 2, 1945, connecting Aubrey to the former community of New Hope at what was then SH 24 (now US 380). The portion in Aubrey was removed on September 25, 1962, and a portion of it became the former SH 99 (now US 377).

FM 425

Farm to Market Road 425 (FM 425) is located in Kleberg County. It runs from US 77 Bus. in Kingsville, past an interchange with US 77, to the access gate at Naval Air Station Kingsville.

FM 425 was designated on September 21, 1955, on the current route.

FM 425 (1945–1952)

The first FM 425 was designated on July 2, 1945, from Sanger to Bolivar. On July 15, 1949, the road was extended west . On May 23, 1951, the road was extended west  to FM 1656. On July 5, 1951, the   FM 1656 became part of FM 425. On November 20, 1951, the road was extended east  to a road intersection. FM 425 was cancelled on June 25, 1952, and transferred to FM 455.

FM 425 (1952–1953)

The next use of the FM 425 designation was in Tarrant County, from FM 156 at Saginaw, east and south 9.6 miles to SH 121. FM 425 was cancelled on December 1, 1953, and removed from the highway system in exchange for creation of FM 1220.

FM 426

Farm to Market Road 426 (FM 426) is located in Denton County. It runs from the Denton city limit to the shoreline of Lewisville Lake.

FM 426 was designated on July 2, 1945, from US 77 in Denton to a point near the Lewisville Lake shoreline. On June 27, 1995, the route was redesignated Urban Road 426 (UR 426). On June 30, 2016, the segment within the city of Denton was cancelled. The designation of the remaining segment reverted to FM 426 with the elimination of the Urban Road system on November 15, 2018.

FM 427

Farm to Market Road 427 (FM 427) is located in Wilson County. It runs from US 181 in Poth to FM 537 northeast of the town.

On October 26, 1956, the route was changed to end at US 181 adding  to its total length.

FM 427 (1945)

The first FM 427 was designated on July 2, 1945, from SH 10 in Pilot Point in Denton County to the Denton–Collin county line. On November 23, 1948, the road was extended to SH 289 in Celina. FM 427 was cancelled on January 29, 1953, and its mileage was transferred to FM 455.

FM 428

It begins at US 77 in Denton and travels northeast towards Loop 288. Past Loop 288, the highway curves to the east as it exits the city limits of Denton. After crossing a spur of the Ray Roberts Lake State Park, it enters the town of Aubrey, crosses US 377, and passes through western reaches of Celina. FM 428 briefly follows the Denton-Collin county line before fully entering Collin County and ending at FM 455.

The last major change to FM 428 occurred on September 25, 1962, when it took over a portion of SH 99 from Denton to Aubrey. On June 27, 1995, the  section from US 77 to Loop 288 was redesignated Urban Road 428 (UR 428). The designation of this section reverted to FM 428 with the elimination of the Urban Road system on November 15, 2018.

Junction list

FM 429

Farm to Market Road 429 (FM 429) is a  route connecting rural Kaufman County to Terrell then to the Lake Tawakoni area in Hunt County. The road begins at an intersection with SH 243 at a point between Kaufman and Canton. FM 429 heads north and northwest through a rural portion the northeast quadrant of the county mostly dotted with ranches. FM 2727 has its northern terminus at an intersection with FM 429 in this area. The road has an interchange with I-20's exit 506 southwest of Elmo; this interchange also has a road connecting FM 429 with FM 2728 which shares a  concurrency with FM 429. North of the concurrency, FM 429 continues northwest through rural lands before it reaches the city limits of Terrell at an intersection with US 80.

US 80 and FM 429 together head west for  before FM 429 breaks off and heads northeast through a rural portion of Kaufman County northeast of Terrell. Some portions of the road are lined with single family houses but most of it is surrounded by ranches. The road heads off of its northeastern bearing to travel towards Ables Springs where it intersects FM 2728 at its northern terminus. FM 429 heads due east for about  before curving to the north and enters Hunt County. The road soon curves to the northeast as it parallels the Lake Tawakoni shoreline for about  before ending at FM 721.

The highway was first designated on June 28, 1945, running from SH 243 to  mile north of Black Jack, a community south of the FM 2727 intersection. On March 26, 1953, FM 429 was extended north  over previously-unnumbered roads and the entire length of the former FM 1837 to US 80 east of downtown Terrell.

FM 430

Farm to Market Road 430 (FM 430) is a  spur road from FM 755 in rural Brooks County. The two-lane road heads north for  through desolate lands populated by a few ranches. At the two-mile mark, the road curves to the west and continues for another  before ending at the entrance to the Tacubaya Ranch. State maintenance ends at this point but the road continues as County Road 314. When the road was designated on June 22, 1945, FM 430 included its current road and current FM 755 to Rachal at US 281. The road achieved its current routing on November 26, 1951, when FM 755 took over most of the road leaving FM 430 on a  route.

FM 431

Farm to Market Road 431 (FM 431) is a  route located in southern Falls County. It begins at SH 320 in the community of Westphalia. It heads on a zig-zagging route generally heading east to Travis where it has a  concurrency with US 77. East of there, the road travels on a much straighter path to the east-northeast path where it intersects FM 3145 and ends at FM 2027 in the community of Cedar Springs.

The highway was designated on June 30, 1945, running from Travis to Cedar Springs. This portion of the road was transferred to FM 2027 on October 14, 1960. Three more extensions to the west would occur in the 1960s: a  extension on August 28, 1963, from US 77, a further  extension on May 6, 1964, and to its current western terminus on July 11, 1968.

FM 432

Farm to Market Road 432 (FM 432) is located in Wilbarger County, near the Oklahoma border. The  road travels from an interchange with US 287 in the community of Tolbert north to FM 91 south of Odell. Near the road's midpoint, it intersects FM 924. Designated on July 9, 1945, FM 432 has not been changed significantly since it was created.

FM 433

Farm to Market Road 433 (FM 433) is a  route in Wilbarger County acting as a southern bypass of Vernon. It heads east then turns to the south. At FM 2074, it curves back to the east making a beeline towards US 183 and US 283. After intersecting FM 3207, the road forms a  concurrency with US 183/US 283 before breaking off towards the east again. In this segment of the road, FM 433 intersects FM 1949, FM 3430, and FM 2897. It ends at an interchange with US 70/US 183/US 287 east of Vernon at the community of Oklaunion.

The road was first designated on July 9, 1945, running from Lockett to US 183/US 283 south of Vernon. The road was extended to its current length on October 31, 1957, when FM 433 was routed along previously unnumbered roads.

FM 434

Farm to Market Road 434 (FM 434) is a  route in the vicinity of Waco. It begins in the community of Chilton at SH 7 and travels north through Falls County. Upon crossing into McLennan County, it travels along the city limits of Robinson before breaking off the boundary at FM 3400. At SH 6/Loop 340, the through movement on FM 434 is completed along the former's frontage roads. North of SH 6/Loop 340, the road enters Waco. The highway ends at Bus. US 77. From here, the road continues through the campus of Baylor University as University Parks Drive, passing the Texas Sports Hall of Fame before reaching an interchange with I-35 and US 77.

FM 434 was designated on July 9, 1945, running from the community of Asa to Waco at La Salle Avenue (now Bus. US 77) via Downsville. On July 14, 1949, the road was extended south to the Falls County line. The road was extended to Satin on February 27, 1958, and was extended to its current southern terminus on April 22, 1958, taking over FM 2116. On September 26, 1963, the road was extended north further into Waco to I-35. On May 26, 1970, a spur connection in Waco was added. On June 27, 1995, the segment of FM 434 west of SH 6 was redesignated Urban Road 434 (UR 434). On April 27, 2017, the section of FM 434 from I-35 to Bus. US 77 was given to the city of Waco, as was the spur connection. The designation of the section west of SH 6 reverted to FM 434 with the elimination of the Urban Road system on November 15, 2018.

Junction list

FM 435

Farm to Market Road 435 (FM 435) is located in Yoakum County. It runs from FM 213 (formerly FM 396) near Bennett to US 82 and US 380 east of Plains. It was designated on its current routing on May 23, 1951.

FM 435 (1945–1948)

The first FM 435 was designated on July 9, 1945, from Elm Mott to Leroy in McLennan County. FM 435 was cancelled on November 23, 1948, and became a portion of FM 308.

FM 436

Farm to Market Road 436 (FM 436) is located in Bell County. The highway travels southeast to Little River-Academy where it intersects SH 95. East of the town, FM 436 makes a sharp turn to the north where it has an interchange with US 190 and SH 36 and ends in the community of Heidenheimer at US 190 Bus.

FM 436 was created on June 11, 1945, to run from Belton to Little River (the former name of Little River-Academy). There were two extensions of the road on September 9, 1948, when it was brought east of Little River to SH 95 and on October 26, 1949, upon slight realignments at both ends. On December 18, 1951, the road was brought to its current length when it was extended to what was then US 190 in Heidenheimer. On June 27, 1995, the section of FM 436 west of Loop 121 was redesignated Urban Road 436 (UR 436). The designation of this section reverted to FM 436 with the elimination of the Urban Road system on November 15, 2018.

Junction list

FM 437

Farm to Market Road 437 (FM 437) is a  route in Milam and Bell counties. It begins in the community of Davilla in Milam County at FM 487 and travels north. It intersects FM 1915 and in the community of Val Verde, FM 2268. Upon entering Bell County, the road comes into Rogers where it intersects Mesquite Avenue (US 190/SH 36/FM 2184) in the center of the town. It heads north through Red Ranger where FM 437 intersects FM 940 at the latter's western terminus before itself ends at SH 53 in the community of Zabcikville.

The road connecting Rogers and Zabcikville was designated as FM 437 on June 6, 1946. It was extended south to Joe Lee School, southwest of Rogers, on December 17, 1952. On March 28, 1953, FM 2184 replaced the portion of the road from Joe Lee School to Rogers while FM 437's route south of Rogers was moved to follow its current route to the Bell County line. On October 26, 1954, the southern terminus of the road was moved to Val Verde. This configuration lasted until June 25, 1962, when the final segment of FM 437 to Davilla was designated.

On September 24, 2020, FM 437 was rerouted on a more direct route, and the old route became FM Spur 437.

FM 438

Farm to Market Road 438 (FM 438) is a  route in eastern Bell County. The road begins at the intersection of Loop 363 and Young Avenue in the northeastern quadrant of Temple. The road generally heads in an eastern direction where it intersects FM 2086 just outside of the Temple city limits. Near the community of Oenaville, the road turns to the north at its intersection with FM 3369. FM 438 ends at FM 935 in the community of Belfalls, only feet from the Bell–Falls county line.

When the road was designated on June 11, 1945, FM 438 ran from downtown Temple to Oenaville. It was extended north to its current terminus at Belfalls on November 21, 1956. The  segment of FM 438 internal to Loop 363 was transferred to the city of Temple's jurisdiction on November 29, 1990. Prior to the transfer, FM 438 started at Adams Avenue (SH 53) and traveled along 8th Avenue, French Avenue, 12th Avenue, Garfield Avenue, 14th Avenue, and Shell Avenue through the city.

FM 439

Farm to Market Road 439 (FM 439) is located in Bell County stretching from US 190 Bus. in Killeen to SH 317 in Belton.

On October 28, 1953, the road was extended to the Nolanville area (for a total of ) with the addition of a spur road through Nolanville. It was extended east  on October 26, 1954. It was extended northeast  on July 28, 1955. On November 21, 1956, FM 439 was extended  to FM 2271. On July 16, 1975, FM 439 was extended east to SH 317, replacing a section of FM 2271. On June 21, 1985, the section along 8th Street was given to the city of Killeen. Instead, FM 439 was rerouted west via Rancier Avenue to RM 440 (Fort Hood Street). On January 27, 1988, RM 440 was cancelled, so FM 439 was extended south to US 190 & SH 195 (which replaced the remainder of RM 440 north of Florence; the old route west of Florence was renumbered SH 138). On May 24, 1990, the spur was extended 0.6 miles from US 190 to Old Nolanville Road. The route was redesignated Urban Road 439 (UR 439) on June 27, 1995. The route's current configuration was established on January 31, 2002, when the portion of the road from Fort Hood's gate to FM 2410 was returned to the city of Killeen; the section from Fort Hood Gate to US 190 and SH 195 became part of SH 195, and FM 439 was rerouted replacing a section of FM 2410 to US 190 Bus. The designation reverted to FM 439 with the elimination of the Urban Road system on November 15, 2018.

FM 440

Farm to Market Road 440 (FM 440) is located in Archer County. It runs from US 82 Bus./US 277 Bus. and College Avenue in Holliday to FM 1954 east of the town. FM 440 was designated on May 10, 1993. On July 31, 1997, FM 440 was extended north and west to FM 368. Construction has not started on the extension from US 82 to FM 368.

A  spur road of FM 440 was designated on July 31, 1997, in the town of Holliday but construction has not been started.

FM/RM 440 (1945–1988) 

The first FM 440 was designated on June 11, 1945, from Killeen southwest . On May 26, 1949, the road was extended south  to a point 3 miles south of Reese Creek School. The road was redesignated Ranch to Market Road 440 (RM 440) on October 1, 1956. On October 15, 1985, a  section of the road along Fort Hood Street from FM 439 to Loop 518 (which was redesignated as Business US 190-F on June 21, 1990) was added. RM 440 was cancelled on January 27, 1988; the section from SH 195 (which the section west of RM 440 was renumbered as SH 138) to US 190 was transferred to rerouted SH 195 and the section from US 190 to FM 439 was transferred to FM 439. That section of FM 439 that was previously RM 440 was transferred to SH 195 on January 31, 2002.

FM 441

Farm to Market Road 441 (FM 441) is located in Wharton County. It begins near the settlement of Danevang in the southern portion of the county at SH 71. The road heads west then curves to the north as it passes through a largely agricultural portion of the state. In the community of Hillje, FM 441 has a  concurrency with Loop 524 before heading back north. The road passes over Future I-69/US 59 which has ramps to the southbound lanes of the highway (access to and from the northbound lanes of Future I-69/US 59 is provided through Loop 524). It continues north to its end at FM 1300 northwest of El Campo.

When it was designated on July 9, 1945, FM 441 was a  spur of US 59 (now part of Loop 524) that ran north from Hillje. The road was brought to its current length on October 31, 1957, by extending the road east to SH 71.

FM 442

Farm to Market Road 442 (FM 442) is located in Wharton and Fort Bend counties. The highway begins at SH 60 at Lane City in Wharton County, runs to the northeast through Boling-Iago and ends on SH 36 southeast of Needville in Fort Bend County.

It starts as a two-lane road at SH 60 in Lane City. In town, the road is also called Lenert Street. From there, FM 442 goes northeast  to its intersection with FM 1096. FM 442 turns to the northeast and goes  to Boling-Iago where it intersects FM 1301 at a four-way stop sign.

After a slight jog, FM 442 continues in the same direction for  where it terminates at SH 36 to the southeast of Needville.

FM 442 was designated on July 9, 1945, from SH 60 at Lane City to Boling. It was extended  from Boling to the Fort Bend County line on February 25, 1948. The highway was extended again to SH 36 on July 22, 1949.

Junction list

FM 443

Farm to Market Road 443 (FM 443) is a  route in DeWitt and Gonzales counties. The road starts at an intersection with SH 111 (just east of US 183) in the settlement of Hochheim in DeWitt County. Paralleling the Guadalupe River, the road enters Gonzales County near the settlement of Dreyer. FM 443 then starts to travel on a zig-zagging route north where it intersects FM 533. In the community of Kokernot, FM 443 ends at US 90 Alt.

The highway was designated on July 9, 1945, running from the community of Dozer via Kokernot to SH 200 (now US 90 Alternate). On December 16, 1948, the road was extended south to the DeWitt-Gonzales county line. It was brought to its current length on July 21, 1949, when the southern terminus was moved to what is now its current terminus.

FM 444

Farm to Market Road 444 (FM 444) is a  route in the northeastern quadrant of Victoria County. The road is shaped as an arc around the city of Victoria and travels through a very sparse area. The only other state-maintained roads that FM 444 intersects throughout its trip are at its southern terminus, FM 1686, at an interchange with I-69/US 59 in Inez, and its northern terminus at US 77.

When the road was designated on July 9, 1945, it was a  spur road from US 59 in Inez south to oil fields in the vicinity of the Garcitas Creek. On November 23, 1948, FM 444 was extended northwest  miles. On May 25, 1962, the road extended southeast and southwest to FM 1686, replacing FM 2545. The road was extended northwest  on July 11, 1968, ending it 5 miles northwest of Inez. On November 3, 1972, the road extended northwest . On September 5, 1973, the road extended northwest  to Salem Road. On October 21, 1981, the road extended northwest . On October 26, 1983, FM 444 was extended northwest  to US 77.

FM 445

Farm to Market Road 445 (FM 445) is located in Victoria County, connecting US 77 to the community of McFaddin. It begins at US 77 and San Antonio River Road (north of its namesake) and travels east through a sparsely-populated brush-filled area of land. Upon crossing a Union Pacific railroad, the road enters McFaddin and continues past some houses and a post office. It ends at the intersection of McFadden Road and Cusham Road. The road was designated on July 9, 1945, along its current route. The road was truncated to its original and current routing on December 17, 1952.

FM 446

Farm to Market Road 446 (FM 446) connects the Victoria area to oil fields southwest of the city. The  highway begins at an intersection with Kemper City Road in a rural area of the county. The area which was once part of multiple oil fields is now made up of brush and a low density of homes. The road heads northeast crossing Boggy Creek and having an intersection with the divided US 59/US 77. As the road gets closer to the city limits, the number of homes that surround the road increases but FM 446 ends at an intersection with US 77 Bus. before reaching the city. The road's designation was applied on July 9, 1945, as a  spur from US 77 (now US 77 Bus.) outside of Victoria. On November 23, 1948, the road was extended southwest 7 miles to end at Fleming School; it has not been changed significantly since then.

FM 447

Farm to Market Road 447 (FM 447) is a  Victoria County farm to market road that acts as a connector between FM 236 in Mission Valley and US 87 in Nursery. The road begins in a mostly rural, but dotted with some ranch homes, section of the county northwest of the city of Victoria and heads northeast. After crossing the Guadalupe River and passing the South Texas Electric Cooperative's Red Gate Power Plant, the road curves more to the north and enters a more sparse area before ending at US 87. The road was designated on July 9, 1945, to run from Lower Mission Valley Road (near the Guadalupe River) to US 87 in Nursery.

FM 448

Farm to Market Road 448 (FM 448) is a  route connecting Winchester in Fayette County with Giddings in Lee County. The road begins in the center of Winchester at an intersection with FM 153. It heads north-northeast out of the community paralleling a Union Pacific railroad. After crossing into Lee County, FM 448 crosses the aforementioned railroad at Northrup and continues heading north further away from the railroad. The road intersects FM 2239 at the latter's eastern terminus before heading back towards the northeast, crossing the railroad again, and entering Giddings city limits. At South Main Street (US 77), FM 448 reaches its northern terminus. The road was designated on June 11, 1945, running from Northrup to Giddings, and was extended to Winchester on October 31, 1957.

FM 449

Farm to Market Road 449 (FM 449) is located in Gregg and Harrison counties, running from US 259 near Judson east to Loop 390 in Marshall.

FM 449 was designated on June 11, 1945, from US 80 in west Marshall west  to what is now FM 450. On December 2, 1953, it extended west . On July 15, 1957, the south end was changed from US 80 to what was then SH 154 (now Loop 390). On December 31, 1959, the section from FM 450 to FM 2208 was transferred to FM 2208. On October 17, 1966, the section of FM 450 from FM 449 to FM 2208 was transferred to FM 449. Also, the section of FM 2208 from FM 450 to what was then FM 2657 was transferred to FM 449. FM 2657 from FM 449 to US 259 was replaced by FM 449.

Junction list

FM 450

Farm to Market Road 450 (FM 450) is a  route that runs through Harrison, Marion, and Upshur counties in northeastern Texas. It begins in western Harrison County at the intersection of FM 968 and FM 2625 (the latter also ends here) and travels north towards Hallsville. Before reaching the city limits, FM 450 interchanges I-20 at its exit 604. Heading north into Hallsville, it intersects US 80 in the center of the city. North of there, the road travels through a winding route through ranches and woodlands. At Carterville, FM 450 forms a concurrency with FM 449 and FM 2208. The FM 449 concurrency is about  while the FM 2208 concurrency is much longer. The two highways cross the Little Cypress Bayou. Before reaching Harleton, FM 2208 breaks off the concurrency towards the east while FM 450 continues into the community where it reaches SH 154.

In Harleton, FM 450 and SH 154 together head west for  until FM 450 breaks off to head northwest. This section of the road passes through wooded areas in northwestern Harrison County. The road forms a concurrency with FM 726 just south of the Lake O' the Pines. FM 726 provides access to the southern shoreline of the lake. FM 450 continues northwest where it briefly enters Marion County. Most of the roads that intersect FM 450 provide access to a small community on the lake's western shore. FM 450 heads into Upshur County and shortly thereafter the city of Ore City. The highway ends at an intersection with US 259 and FM 1649.

FM 450 was designated on June 11, 1945, running as a road connecting Harleton to Smyrna, a small settlement located south of the modern-day FM 726 intersection. On July 15, 1949, the road was brought north to Ore City partially via what had been Spur 162. The last extension occurred on October 15, 1954, when FM 450 was routed south of Hallsville and assumed its current length. By 2016, FM 450 was rerouted north of FM 449 to go via a more straight path.

Junction list

FM 451

Farm to Market Road 451 (FM 451) is a  route in Harrison County.

The western terminus of FM 451 is in Elysian Fields at FM 31. The route heads east and crosses the West Fork Socagee Creek before reaching its eastern terminus at FM 9. The roadway continues as Don Long Road.

On November 23, 1948, the route was extended west to FM 31 in Elysian Fields. On November 18, 1953, the portion of the road between Don Long Road and Waskom was transferred to FM 9.

FM 452

Farm to Market Road 452 (FM 452) is a  route in southern Cottle County. Starting at County Road 706, the route heads north for about a mile (1.6 km), curves to the east, then to the north again. At the settlement of Delwin, FM 452 reaches the southern terminus of FM 2278. The road was designated on July 9, 1945, running only along the east-west portion from Delwin to US 83. On October 31, 1958, the road was extended  to the south and west to end at its current endpoint.

FM 453

Farm to Market Road 453 (FM 453) is a  route in western Wheeler County. Starting at I-40's exit 152 and County Road 6, the highway heads due north through ranch and agricultural lands. Near the southern end, it crosses the North Long Dry Creek. The highway terminates at FM 2473 where it makes a reverse curve.

FM 454
Farm to Market Road 454 (FM 454) is a designation that was used four times. No highway currently uses the FM 454 designation.

FM 454 (1945)

This designation was cancelled five months later, as the proposed route followed SH 59, in which that portion was designated on January 10, 1945.

FM 454 (1951–1964)

The second iteration of the FM 454 designation was in Yoakum County, from SH 328 (now SH 83) north through Allred and east to SH 214. FM 454 was cancelled on December 20, 1963; the section from SH 214 to FM 1622 was returned to Yoakum County and the section from FM 1622 to SH 83 was transferred to FM 1622.

FM 454 (1978–1987)

The third use of the FM 454 was in Rusk County on a loop route from US 259 to US 259 in Henderson. FM 454 was cancelled on September 29, 1987, and transferred to Loop 571.

FM 454 (1989)

The fourth designation of FM 454 was a  route near Rockwall. The road, which carried the name of Tandem Trail, traveled from SH 276 to FM 551. It was designated on November 29, 1989. When construction was complete, FM 454 was cancelled. No TxDOT order cancelling FM 454 has been found.

FM 455

Farm to Market Road 455 (FM 455) is a  state highway in the northern portion of Texas. It runs through portions of Montague, Cooke, Wise, Denton, and Collin counties.

FM 455 was originally designated on July 9, 1945, from SH 59 in Montague southeast . On December 17, 1945, it extended  to Mallard. On November 23, 1948, it extended  to Forestburg. On July 14, 1949, it extended southeast . On November 20, 1951, it extended southeast to FM 51, replacing FM 1657. On June 25, 1952, the section from the new junction of FM 730 to the old junction of FM 730 was transferred to FM 730. Also, the section from FM 730 to FM 51 was renumbered as FM 1204. Part of that road was numbered as FM 1656 earlier. On December 17, 1952, FM 455 was extended east  to the end of FM 1829. It replaced FM 1829 from that intersection to what is now US 377. On January 29, 1953, FM 455 replaced FM 427 from what is now US 377 to FM 543, the section of FM 543 from there to what is now SH 5, and FM 1376 from what is now SH 5 to Westminster. On October 31, 1957, FM 455 was extended east to SH 160 in Desert. On April 29, 1959, the eastern terminus was changed to FM 545. On July 26, 1963, the section from SH 5 to FM 545 was renumbered as FM 2862 and it extended east to SH 121 on a different route. On June 2, 1967, it extended east to FM 2862. On November 26, 1969, it extended southwest  from SH 59 in Montague. In 1987, Lake Ray Roberts was completed and FM 455 was rerouted over the dam, completing two new routes: FM 1190 (which was designated from FM 455 eastward to the Lake Ray Roberts marina) and FM 1192 (which was designated from the east side of the lake, through Pilot Point to its connection with the original FM 455 at US 377).

FM 456

Farm to Market Road 456 (FM 456) is a  route in Matagorda County. After crossing the Tres Palacios Creek, state maintenance ends at the intersection of Rugeley Road and Dabelgott Road. It was designated on June 25, 1945, along its present route.

FM 457

Farm to Market Road 457 (FM 457) (designated as the Sergeant Joe Parks Jr. Memorial Highway) is located in Matagorda County. The highway begins at an intersection with SH 35 in the eastern reaches of Bay City and travels east. In the area of Caney, it passes near the Bay City Municipal Airport and intersects FM 2540. It continues east but begins to curve towards the southeast in Cedar Lane where FM 457 then intersects FM 521. After passing Gainesmore, Hawkinsville, and FM 2611 at its western terminus, FM 457 passes through the community of Sargent, crosses the Sargent Swing Bridge, a pontoon-style swing bridge over the Intracoastal Waterway, and ends on the Matagorda Peninsula not far from a beach on the Gulf of Mexico. The entire highway is also known as the Sergeant Joe Parks, Jr. Memorial Highway.

The highway was created on June 25, 1945, running from Bay City to Gainesmore. On December 17, 1952, FM 457 was further extended southeast to the Gulf of Mexico taking over what had been State Highway 330. SH 330 was a  highway that existed from May 1940 until its absorption by FM 457 and only consisting of the bridge (constructed as a wooden swing bridge at the time) over the Intracoastal Waterway.

TxDOT is currently in the process of replacing the swing bridge, the last in the entire state, with a fixed concrete span with helix roads on both ends to allow for clearance over the canal. The process to begin the replacement began in September 2013 and completion is expected in 2020.

Junction list

FM 458

Farm to Market Road 458 (FM 458) is a  route near the western border of Matagorda County. The entire highway is two-lane undivided road that crosses a Union Pacific railroad line at its southern terminus, and then continues through a mix of farm fields and woods with occasional homes. Farther north, the highway heads into open agricultural areas, turning east before a turn back to the north towards its end. The road does not have any other junctions with Texas state roads.

The highway was designated on June 25, 1945, as a  spur from SH 111. On September 21, 1955, the road's southern terminus was extended south to FM 616 where it has remained since then.

FM 459

Farm to Market Road 459 (FM 459) is a  route in Matagorda County. It heads south for  following the Tres Palacios Creek until it crosses a Union Pacific railroad and turns to the east paralleling the railroad. After , the road turns to the south and then returns to an easterly bearing. The road heads through mostly agricultural lands with some houses along the road and the Tidehaven Intermediate School. FM 459 ends at FM 1095 south of Elmaton. It was designated on June 25, 1945.

FM 460

Farm to Market Road 460 (FM 460) is located in Kaufman County, in and around Forney.

FM 460 was designated on September 21, 1955, on the current route.

FM 460 (1945)

FM 460 was cancelled on October 15, 1954, and combined with FM 521.

FM 461

Farm to Market Road 461 (FM 461) is located in Howard and Glasscock counties. The highway begins at an intersection with FM 818 in rural Howard County southwest of Big Spring. It travels south and heads into Glasscock County. Shortly after the county line, the highway curves to the east and intersects RM 33 in the unincorporated community of Lees. After reentering Howard County, it reaches US 87 and turns north onto the highway. After a  concurrency, FM 461 leaves the concurrency and travels east towards Forsan. After traveling along the town's southern border, the highway turns to the south at Rex Avenue. FM 461 ends at FM 821  to the south of the town.

FM 461 was designated on May 23, 1951, from US 87 southwest to the Glasscock County line. On December 17, 1952, the road was extended to RM 33. It was extended to the west and north to FM 818 on June 1, 1964. Finally, the section from US 87 to FM 821 was added on July 14, 1978, bringing the highway to its current length.

Junction list

FM 461 (1945–1946)

FM 461 was cancelled on March 20, 1946, as a result of a request from the Matagorda County Court and mileage was used by an extension of FM 457.

FM 462

Farm to Market Road 462 (FM 462) is a  through Frio, Medina, and Bandera counties west of San Antonio. The road begins at FM 472 in Bigfoot, Frio County and travels west to Moore where it interchanges I-35. It then starts to curve to the north where it enters Medina County and passes through the community of Yancey where FM 462 shares a concurrency with FM 2200. It continues north to serve the city of Hondo where it has a brief concurrency with US 90. North of the city, FM 462 begins to closely parallel Hondo Creek. Shortly after leaving Medina County for Bandera County, the Hondo Creek heads away from the road and Williams Creek begins to closely parallel the road. FM 462 ends at FM 470 in the community of Tarpley.

FM 462 was created on July 9, 1945, as a road connecting Yancey and Hondo. It was extended north to Tarpley on May 25, 1953, when it took over what was then FM 1888. A southward extension to Moore (at US 81) occurred on October 31, 1957, and the final eastward extension at its south end happened on December 16, 1959, by taking over all of FM 2147.

Junction list

FM 463

Farm to Market Road 463 (FM 463) is located in Medina County southwest of San Antonio. The highway starts at I-35's exit 124 east of Devine and travels west towards the city. Just inside the city limits, FM 463 reaches SH 132 in a cluster of businesses. The two roads form a  concurrency to the northeast until FM 463 breaks off and heads due north through a mix of homes and ranches. About  later, the road takes a right turn to FM 471. After a  concurrency to the north, FM 463 resumes its easterly course before ending at FM 2790. The intersection is located within the city of Lytle and located on the Medina–Atascoa county line.

The east-west portion of the road connecting the northern end to FM 471 was added on December 17, 1952. The portion between FM 471 and FM 2790 was added to the highway on October 31, 1958, and the southern extension to I-35 was added on April 26, 1979.

FM 464

Farm to Market Road 464 (FM 464) is located in central Guadalupe County. The road begins at an intersection with Dunn Street in the unincorporated community of Nolte. The right of way continues west continued towards the Guadalupe River in the past but is now part of the property of a nearby CMC Steel mill. The two-lane road heads east towards Seguin and at the intersection of FM 1620 (which is its southern terminus), the north side of FM 464 is in the city limits of Seguin. It crosses over I-10 at its exit 605. After passing a large distribution warehouse, the road comes to an end at an intersection with US 90 which also doubles as the western terminus of US 90 Alt. The road was created on July 9, 1945, and has not been changed significantly since its creation.

Junction list

FM 465

Farm to Market Road 465 (FM 465) is a  route running from I-10/US 90 to FM 78 in Marion. The road begins along Line Road where it has an interchange with I-10 at the latter's exit 599. FM 465 heads north-northwest through mostly rural areas of Guadalupe County before it enters the town limits of Marion at the Marion High School and Marion Middle School campuses. The highway heads north through Marion on South Center Street before ending at a signalized T-intersection with San Antonio Street, FM 78. FM 465 was designated along its current routing in July 1945, though at the time of its creation, it only intersected US 90 as I-10 had not been constructed yet.

FM 466

Farm to Market Road 466 (FM 466) is a  route running from US 90 in Seguin to SH 97 in Cost. The highway runs through Guadalupe and Gonzales counties in central Texas. It passes by three historic sites, the El Capote Ranch, the H. Wilson & Company, and the site of the Battle of Gonzales.

FM 467

Farm to Market Road 467 (FM 467) is a  route in Guadalupe County connecting the cities of New Berlin and Seguin. The road starts at FM 775 in the narrow municipality of New Berlin and heads east-northeast. After intersecting FM 539 at its northern terminus, the road curves more to the northeast. It passes through a mix of ranches and residential properties. As the road enters the Seguin city limits, it intersects SH 46 acting as a bypass of the city. Further into the city, the road reaches the eastern terminus of FM 725 but soon ends itself at an intersection with SH 123 Bus.

It reached its present configuration on November 13, 1954.

FM 468

Farm to Market Road 468 (FM 468) is a  route in Dimmit and La Salle counties. It heads southeast through rural areas of the two aforementioned counties until it reaches FM 469 outside of Cotulla. After this intersection, the number of commercial business that dot the highway increase until it reaches I-35 at its exit 67. Now within the city limits past the Interstate, FM 468 heads through the city on Leonard Avenue and Leona Street through a residential neighborhood to its end at Main Street (Business Loop I-35).

FM 468 was once much longer that it is now; it included segments east and southeast of Cotulla. On December 16, 1948, FM 468 was extended northwest to Woodward. The road reached its current western terminus at SH 85 on July 31, 1952, by taking over parts of FM 1019 and all of FM 1684, and FM 1684 was reused to replace the old route of FM 468 northwest of US 81 (note that FM 1684 was cancelled and combined with FM 469 on November 16, 1953). The eastern segment was changed often. On December 17, 1952, it was extended along an unconstructed route and what is now FM 469 to SH 97, replacing FM 1342. On July 29, 1953, the section from SH 97 to Los Angeles was renumbered as FM 1919 (current designation is RM 1919; the FM 1342 designation was reused on December 17, 1952). The section from Los Angeles westward 8.3 miles was cancelled and FM 468 was extended southeast . It extended southeast  on September 21, 1955,  on September 27, 1960. Eastern segment was relocated from US 81 (now Business IH-35) on June 25, 1965. January 29, 1976, is when the eastern segment was transferred to FM 624 leaving only the SH 85–Cotulla segment intact.

FM 469

Farm to Market Road 469 (FM 469) is located in La Salle County. The  two-lane road is shaped as a long loop around the north side of Cotulla with inconsistent directional signage throughout. It heads northwest first to the community of Woodward before turning to the northeast. In the community of Millett, FM 469 has an interchange with I-35 at its exit 77. Now heading in an east-southeast direction, the road travels through the barren brush-filled lands of the county. In the community of Los Angeles, the road crosses SH 97.

At the time of its creation on June 25, 1945, the road was only  and traveled from northeast of Woodward to US 81 in Millett.

FM 470

Farm to Market Road 470 (FM 470) is a  route located in the southern portion of Bandera County. Starting at RM 187 north of Utopia, the road heads east through barren ranch lands dotted with brush. The only settlement along the road, Tarpley, is also the location of the only non-endpoint intersection with a state road, FM 462. East of Tarpley, the road heads in a more east-northeastern direction through similar terrain from the first part of the route.

In June 1945, FM 470 was designated as Ranch to Market Road 470 and consisted of a spur road from SH 16 to Tarpley. The road was extended to RM 187 on December 17, 1952. On June 1, 1992, the road was redesignated as FM 470.

FM 471

Farm to Market Road 471 (FM 471) is a  partial loop around the western suburbs of San Antonio in Medina and Bexar counties. It runs from I-35 near Natalia to Loop 1604 inside the San Antonio city limits. It also travels through Pearson, LaCoste, Castroville (where it forms a brief concurrency with US 90), and Rio Medina.

The highway was created on May 23, 1951, running from US 81 in Natalia to US 90 in Castroville. FM 471 was extended east to SH 16 on October 28, 1953. On May 6, 1964, FM 471 was extended southeast to I-35. The northern end was truncated to Loop 1604 by 2018 when the portion of the road between Loop 1604 and the Leon Valley city limits was removed from the state highway system while the portion inside Leon Valley was resigned as Spur 471 when the Project Acceptance Letter for project CSJ 0849-01-047 was sent as part of TxDOT's San Antonio turnback program.

FM 471 (1945–1949)

The first iteration of FM 471 existed from July 9, 1945, to August 1949 entirely in Frio County. For most of its existence, it traveled from SH 84 in Dilley to Divot. Note that this FM 471 (as well as FM 117) was planned as early as March 26, 1942, both to replace part of SH 55, which all of FM 117 was part of.

FM 472

Farm to Market Road 472 (FM 472) is a  route in eastern Frio County southwest of San Antonio. It intersects FM 140 and FM 1549 in rural areas but intersects FM 462 in the community of Bigfoot. At its northern terminus just feet from the Medina County line, FM 472 ends at SH 173.

When it was designated on July 9, 1945, the road consisted of only a spur from SH 173 to Bigfoot. On August 22, 1951, FM 472 was extended west to Moore at US 81. The configuration was changed on April 20, 1954, when FM 472 was routed south to Schattel School and Goldfinch Road over former FM 2147, while the former east-west segment was transferred to FM 2147 (which was transferred to FM 462 on December 16, 1959).

RM 473

Ranch to Market Road 473 (RM 473) is located in Kendall and Blanco counties. It runs from SH 27 in Comfort to RM 32 east of Twin Sisters.

RM 474

Ranch to Market Road 474 (RM 474) is located in Kendall County, northwest of San Antonio. It begins at an intersection with US 87 Bus. in the city of Boerne. The highway heads northeast along East Blanco Road passing the city hall. In front of Boerne High School, RM 474 turns left onto Esser Road and heads out of the city into a desolate rural area. Through the barren lands, the highway travels north and north-northeast over the Guadalupe River and ending at RM 473 about halfway between Sisterdale and Kendalia.

This road became FM 473 on December 18, 1951. FM 474 was changed to RM 474 on October 1, 1956.

FM 475

Farm to Market Road 475 (FM 475) is located in Bee County. Located southeast of the city of Beeville, it runs from the northbound US 181 frontage road southeast to the entrance of the McConnell Unit prison. It was designated on October 29, 1992, on its current route.

FM/RM 475 (1945)

FM 475 was first designated on June 26, 1945, running from US 87 in Boerne east to the intersection of US 281 and SH 46 running in Comal and Kendall counties. On July 18, 1951, the road was extended southwest to the Bandera County line, replacing FM 1719 and creating a concurrency with US 87. The road was extended southwest to SH 16 on December 18, 1951. On October 1, 1956, FM 475 was redesignated as RM 475. RM 475 was cancelled on September 28, 1988, and replaced by SH 46.

FM 476

Farm to Market Road 476 (FM 476) connects the outskirts of Somerset, Bexar County to Pleasanton, Atascosa County via Poteet. About one-third of the road travels and is signed north and south, this is the portion between FM 2790 and FM 2504. From this point, the road heads generally in an east-southeast direction towards Poteet where it has a concurrency with SH 16 and another concurrency through downtown Poteet with Loop 282. Continuing southwest, FM 476 enters the city of Pleasanton where it intersects Spur 242 and heads south along Bryant Street. It ends at SH 97 southwest of the downtown.

The road was created on July 9, 1945, as a spur road running from Pleasanton running  towards Poteet. On December 17, 1946, the road was slightly extended to reach Poteet. FM 476 was extended much further west and north to Bexar County near Somerset on May 25, 1953, by taking over the former FM 1100. FM 476 ran through Pleasanton was along what is now Spur 242 and ended at US 281; the routing was changed to Bryant Avenue on July 16, 1965.

A spur of FM 476 existed in Poteet along School Drive from March 21, 1963, to December 30, 1988. This road became the main route of FM 476, while the main route of FM 476 became FM 3498.

Junction list

FM 477

Farm to Market Road 477 (FM 477) is a  route in central Guadalupe County, southeast of the county seat of Seguin. The route connects SH 123 (just south of its intersection with SH 46) with FM 466.

FM 477 was designated on September 21, 1955, on the current route.

FM 477 (1945–1953)

The first iteration of FM 477 was designated on July 9, 1945, running from SH 173 (now SH 16) to Christine. FM 477 was cancelled on January 29, 1953, and was transferred to FM 140.

FM 478

Farm to Market Road 478 (FM 478) is located in Atascosa and Wilson counties south of San Antonio. The road makes a reverse curve to the east; at the second curve, FM 478 crosses into Wilson County before ending at SH 97. It was created on July 9, 1945, running along the same route as it does today.

RM 479

Beginning at SH 27 between Mountain Home and Ingram, the road heads north through sparsely populated brush lands. It reaches exit 492 of I-10  from its southern terminus. After entering Kimble County, RM 479 intersects US 290 and turns to the northwest. After passing the ghost town of Noxville, the road curves to the west and ends at FM 2169.

RM 479 was designated on July 9, 1945, as Farm to Market Road 479 (FM 479), starting out as a  road traveling from SH 27 to the Reservation Community. It was extended twice in the 1950s: it was extended to the Kerr–Kimble county line on December 17, 1952, and to US 290 on February 24, 1953, respectively. On October 1, 1956, FM 479 was redesignated as RM 479. RM 479 was extended northwestward  on June 30, 1966. It extended northwest  on November 3, 1972. It extended west  on April 25, 1978. It extended west  to the end of RM 1534 on September 26, 1979. The final extension occurred on December 8, 1981, when it took over the entire length of RM 1534.

Junction list

RM 480

Ranch to Market Road 480 (RM 480) is a  route located in Kerr County. It runs from SH 173 in Camp Verde to SH 27 in Center Point. From its southern terminus, the road parallels Verde Creek for about  passing through mostly ranch lands. After breaking away from the creek, the road heads north into residential neighborhoods of Center Point. RM 480 crosses the Guadalupe River and ends at SH 27. Since its designation on July 9, 1945, the road has always followed the same Camp Verde–Center Point routing.

The road was redesignated as Farm to Market Road 480 (FM 480) in 1946 and redesignated RM 480 in 1979.

Junction list

FM 481

Its southern terminus is at an intersection with US 57 in Maverick County. It travels to the northeast and clips the northwestern corner of Zavala County before entering Uvalde County, where it crosses the Nueces River and passes the Uvalde National Fish Hatchery. FM 481 ends at US 90 at the city limits of Uvalde.

On July 8, 1983, FM 481 was extended over the former FM 3078 to its current southern terminus at US 57.

RM 481

Ranch to Market Road 481 (RM 481) was designated on July 9, 1945, in Kerr County. The route was redesignated as FM 481 in 1946. It was deleted on June 4, 1946, with its mileage transferred to the original FM 689 (later SH 173).

FM 482

Farm to Market Road 482 (FM 482) is a  route located in Comal County. Running as an east-west road between the cities of Schertz and New Braunfels, the road generally parallels I-35 between its exits 177 and 184. It begins at the northbound I-35 frontage road at exit 177 and heads to the north. At FM 2252, the road turns to become more parallel to the Interstate and heads through more rural areas of the city. FM 482 exits the city limits of Schertz and begins to skirt around the limits of New Braunfels as it passes near housing developments, trailer parks, and an apartment complex. Around the settlement of Solms, FM 482 merges with the route of former US 81. It ends fully inside the city limits of New Braunfels at the southbound frontage road to I-35 about  later. The road was created on July 9, 1945, from the vicinity of its western terminus to US 81 in Solms. When US 81 was relocated to what is now the right-of-way of I-35 on October 30, 1957, FM 482 was extended another mile to its current eastern terminus.

FM 483

Farm to Market Road 483 (FM 483) was located northeast of downtown New Braunfels. It was designated on July 9, 1945, from US 81 to San Geronimo School. Upon the construction and designation of newer roads, FM 483 would run between the northbound frontage road of I-35 and FM 1101. Around 2006, construction began on the New Braunfels Town Center at Creekside shopping center, which led to the truncation of FM 483 at an access road through the center. Due to the additional extension of nearby FM 306 from I-35 to FM 1101, FM 483 was cancelled on May 27, 2010. Street signs still say "FM 483".

RM 484

Farm to Market Road 484 (RM 484) is a  route in northern Comal County, connecting FM 306 in Canyon Lake to RM 32 in the community of Fischer. From its southern terminus, the two-lane road heads north to an intersection with RM 32. RM 484 continues north of there to head through the center of Fischer passing a general store and post office. It then ends at RM 32 where the road itself continues south as Cranes Mill Road.

RM 484 was designated on July 9, 1945, as Farm to Market Road 484 (FM 484), a spur from RM 32 south towards the area of where the lake is now. On June 1, 1966, FM 484 was extended another  to an Army Corps of Engineers road (now FM 306). In 1979, the designation was changed to RM 484.

FM 485

Farm to Market Road 485 (FM 485) is a  route in Bell, Milam, and Robertson counties in central Texas. Starting at SH 53 near Zabcikville, the road heads east, southeast, and east again through mostly agricultural lands passing small settlements along the way. About two-fifths of the trip in, it intersects US 77. The road heads through areas of again farmland but the density of woods increases as it approaches the Brazos River. FM 485 crosses the river, has a short concurrency with FM 1644, and enters the city limits of Hearne. After passing through some residential neighborhoods of the northern reaches of the city, FM 485 ends at an intersection with US 79 and SH 6.

The road was created on July 12, 1945, running from Yarrellton (the location of the modern-day FM 1915) to Splawn at US 77 and then-US 190. On November 20, 1951, the FM 485 was extended south from Yarrellton to Buckholts at US 190. On October 3, 1966, the portion of the road from Buckholt to Yarrellton was redesignated FM 1915 while FM 485 took over the route of part of FM 2269. Finally on March 31, 1975, US 190 was moved to a routing further south between Cameron and Hearne; FM 485 took over the route of US 190 between US 77 and US 79 at that time.

Junction list

FM 486

Farm to Market Road 486 (FM 486) is a  route that runs mostly in Milam County with a small portion near its southern terminus being in Williamson County. From its south end at FM 112 in the community of Shiloh, the road heads north crossing into Milam County about  into its journey. In the city of Thorndale, FM 486 crosses US 79.  north of Thorndale, FM 486 crosses three farm to market roads (908, 1331, and 3061) at their termini and crosses the San Gabriel River in the community of San Gabriel. Heading east then north through agricultural lands, the road intersects FM 487 and the Little River. As the road approaches the community of Pettibone, the road briefly heads east to parallel a BNSF railroad, turns north to cross the railroad, and ends at US 190 and SH 36.

FM 486 was created on July 12, 1945, running from Thorndale to San Gabriel. On November 23, 1948, the road was extended north to Pettibone at US 190. On November 24, 1959, the road was extended south to Shiloh.

FM 487

Farm to Market Road 487 (FM 487) is a  route located in Williamson, Bell, and Milam counties in central Texas. The route's western terminus is at SH 195 in Florence. It travels east to Jarrell where there is a discontinuity of the road at I-35. After resuming on the other side of I-35, it continues to the east through Bartlett but then curves towards the south before entering Rockdale. In Rockdale, there is a short concurrency with US 79. It then ends south of Rockdale at an intersection with US 77.

FM 487 was designated on July 12, 1945, from Rockdale to Tracy. On May 23, 1951, it extended west to Sharp. On December 17, 1952, it extended west to Davilla. On October 26, 1954, it extended west to FM 1236 at the Bell County Line. On January 6, 1955, FM 1236 was canceled and combined, bringing the road to its current western terminus. Note that part of FM 1236 was FM 1329. On June 1, 1960, it extended south along the old route of US 77 to US 79. On November 1, 1962, it extended further east along US 79 and further south along the old route of US 77, bringing the road to its current eastern terminus. On August 31, 1965, it was relocated in Jarrell along a different route and I-35. On December 12, 2019, the highway was relocated along Bud Stockton Loop; the old route east to I-35 was given to the city of Jarrell.

Junction list

FM 488

The road begins at US 84 (East Commerce Street) east of downtown Fairfield (but still within the city limits) and travels east and northeast along Main Street. Northeast of the city limits, FM 488 curves more to the north at an intersection where FM 2570 heads off to the north-northeast. The road passes a railroad balloon loop which provides an unloading point for coal to the Big Brown Coal Plant and FM 833. It also passes the Freestone Energy Center (a natural gas-powered generating station) and FM 1124. After the road's intersection with FM 417's eastern terminus, the road descends in elevation to travel along the bottom of the dam restraining the Richland-Chambers Reservoir. After a bridge that spans the Richland Creek (immediately downstream of the dam), FM 488 ends at an intersection with US 287. It was extended north to US 287 on February 27, 1948.

FM 489

Farm to Market Road 489 (FM 489) is a  route in Limestone and Freestone counties. Starting at SH 164 near Personville, the road travels northeast through Limestone County for about  before heading east through Freestone County for the rest of its route. In the settlement of Freestone, FM 489 shares a  concurrency with FM 80. Heading through Dew, the road passes over I-45 without an interchange but intersects SH 179 and SH 75 (the former providing access to the Interstate). Heading past Lanely where it intersects FM 1848, FM 489 begins to curve to the north and intersects US 84 in the settlement of Red Lake. The highway continues northwest of the U.S. Highway for just under  but curves to the northeast past that point. It ends at the intersection of County Roads 240, 241, and 271.

On May 31, 1955, FM 1368 and FM 1915 were combined into portions of FM 489 such that it now ran from SH 164 to Lanely. On December 10, 1956, FM 489 took over the routing of FM 1980 to bring the eastern terminus of the route to US 84. The last extension north of US 84 occurred on September 27, 1960, with FM 489 being routed over previously unnumbered roads.

FM 490

Farm to Market Road 490 (FM 490) is a  route in Starr, Hidalgo, and Willacy counties. Beginning at FM 755 between Rio Grande City and La Gloria, the road heads east through a rural area comprising farm lands and oil wells. The road eventually leaves Starr County for Hidalgo and comes to the community of McCook where some small businesses, homes, and churches are found. In this town, a  concurrency begins with FM 681. In the vicinity of the road's interchange with I-69C/US 281, it briefly enters the Edinburg city limits and passes the entrance to South Texas International Airport at Edinburg. East of here, the road begins to make successive 90-degree bends but still maintains an overall heading of east. The final town in Hidalgo County through which FM 490 passes is Hargill where it intersects FM 493.

The remainder of the road through Willacy County passes mainly through unincorporated rural areas no passing through any settlements, though it does pass near Lasara at its intersection with FM 1015. It also passes near Raymondville where it crosses US 77 Bus. Surrounding this intersection are some large stores and housing complexes. East of this intersection, FM 490 has an interchange with I-69E and US 77.  later, the road ends at FM 1420 near the settlement of Willamar.

FM 490 was created on June 26, 1945, running from its intersection with US 281 to the Hidaldo-Willacy county line. On November 11, 1948, it was slightly extended east to FM 88. The next extension occurred on January 20, 1958, when it was extended over the entire length of FM 2059 to end at FM 681. On February 15, 1958, FM 490 was extended over FM 1561 to end at FM 755. FM 490 was extended east from FM 88 to FM 1015 on May 6, 1964, and to FM 2099 on June 1 of that year, over the entire length of FM 1432. The final eastward extension to FM 1420 occurred on June 1, 1965.

Junction list

FM 491

Farm to Market Road 491 (FM 491) is a  route in Hidalgo and Willacy counties in the southernmost portion of Texas. It runs between Relampago and US 281 ( from the Mexico–United States border) and US 77 Bus. just south of Lyford. It begins heading north from US 281 through agricultural lands. Upon entering the city of Mercedes, it forms a  concurrency with US 83 Bus. west through the city's downtown. After the concurrency, the road heads north where it has an interchange with I-2 and US 83. Passing through residential neighborhoods of northern Mercedes, Indian Hills, and Laguna Seca, the road continues north with some curves around canals that line the area. In the city of La Villa, FM 491 intersects SH 107 in the city center. North of this city, the road make numerous 90-degree bends as it finishes its trip through Hidalgo County and starts traveling through Willacy County. After intersecting numerous farm to market roads, the road ends at US 77 Bus. immediately adjacent to a Union Pacific railroad.

The road was designated on June 26, 1945, to run between SH 107 in La Villa and US 77 (now the highway's business route). It was extended south to US 83 in Mercedes on May 23, 1951. It was extended south to US 281 on June 21, 1951, replacing FM 1428. FM 491 was routed through Mercedes on 10th Street and Texas Avenue; a spur to US 83 via Mistletoe Avenue was added on November 20, 1951. The routing through the city was changed on March 27, 1952, by removing the portion of 10th Street and Texas Avenue south of US 83 (part of its business route today) and routing the mainline via the spur road.

Junction list

FM 492

Farm to Market Road 492 (FM 492) is a  route located in Hidalgo County. The highway begins at an intersection with Goodwin Road and US 83 Bus. in the city of Palmview. It heads north along Goodwin Road and after intersecting the frontage roads of Interstate 2/US 83, the highway exits the city limits of Palmview and jogs to the right at Three Mile Road and FM 1924 before traveling north again on Doffing Road. It intersects FM 676 at the latter's western terminus before FM 492 terminates at FM 2221 (Mile 7 Road).

On May 23, 1951, the road was extended north to its current northern terminus and then east along current FM 2221 to FM 681. On January 7, 1987, the east-west portion between FM 2221 and FM 681 was transferred to FM 2221 leaving FM 492 on its current routing. The section of FM 492 south of FM 1924 was redesignated Urban Road 492 (UR 492) on June 27, 1995. The designation of that segment reverted to FM 492 with the elimination of the Urban Road system on November 15, 2018.

FM 493

It begins at the Donna–Río Bravo International Bridge where state maintenance begins. Starting out as a four-lane divided highway, the road heads east then turns to the north intersecting US 281. North of here, the road narrows to two lanes and travels through agricultural land. Before entering the city of Donna, the number of residential complexes surrounding the road increases. Inside the city, the road widens to four lanes again (but undivided) surrounded by residential neighborhoods. After crossing US 83 Bus., the road heads through a commercial district in the city. North of its interchange with I-2 and US 83, the road remains four lanes wide and passes through a mix of residences and farm lane. The road narrows to two lanes before curving to due north.

In the census designated place of La Blanca, the road crosses SH 107. The mix of houses and farms is still present as the road passes FM 1925 and has a short concurrency with FM 2812. Residences dwindle north of the concurrency except when FM 493 reaches the community of Hargill where it intersects FM 490 in the town center. The road comes to an end at SH 186 near tracts of the Lower Rio Grande Valley National Wildlife Refuge and the Willacy County line.

On December 14, 1956, the road was expanded northward on a new alignment of the road to US 83. On January 21, 1957, the road was extended northward to Hargill at FM 490, replacing FM 890. A  extension of the road to SH 186 north of Hargill occurred on September 27, 1960.

Junction list

FM 494

Farm to Market Road 494 (FM 494) is a  route in Hidalgo County. FM 494 begins heading southeast paralleling a Rio Valley Switching Company railroad before it crosses the railroad and continues to the southeast. After passing under FM 396 and the Anzalduas International Bridge, FM 494 enters the city limits of Granjeno before curving to the north and passing through a small portion of McAllen and back into Mission. It intersects FM 1016 again before continuing north on Shary Road through Mission. In Mission, there are intersections with I-2/US 83's frontage roads, US 83 Bus., and SH 495. North of Mission, the highway passes through the city of Palmhurst where it intersects FM 1924. It also briefly follows the eastern border of Alton in the vicinity of FM 676. FM 494 ends at SH 107.

The highway was designated on June 26, 1945, as a  spur south from SH 107. The loop through Granjeno was added on July 11, 1968. Except for a small extension at its southern end (western intersection with FM 1016) in 1985, the highway has not had any major changes since then. On June 27, 1995, the route was redesignated Urban Road 494 (UR 494). The designation reverted to FM 494 with the elimination of the Urban Road system on November 15, 2018.

FM 495

Farm to Market Road 495 (FM 495) is the former designation of SH 495 in Hidalgo County.

FM 496

Farm to Market Road 496 (FM 496) is a  route in Zapata County near the Rio Grande and Mexican border. FM 496 continues northeast past some light industrial businesses and a cemetery. At this point, the two-lane road enters the community of Zapata and expands to four-lanes wide. The road travels for three blocks before ending at an intersection with US 83 and SH 16 which begins ahead.

Upon its designation on July 9, 1945, the road included all of what comprises FM 496 now and SH 16 to the Jim Hogg County line. On August 13, 1945, the road was extended much further along modern SH 16 to Hebbronville. It was shortened to its current length on September 31, 1965, when SH 16 was extended over the road between Zapata to Freer.

FM 497

Farm to Market Road 497 (FM 497) was located in Willacy County and connected San Perlita to the Red Fish Bay at Port Mansfield. The highway started in downtown San Perlita when it was designated on July 9, 1945, but its western starting point was moved to south of the city on November 23, 1948. On May 31, 1973, FM 497 was signed (but not designated) as SH 186. This  alignment of the road lasted until August 29, 1990, when it was officially designated as SH 186.

FM 498

Farm to Market Road 498 (FM 498) is a  route in southern Willacy County. It runs from the intersection of Olive Road and Business US 77 in Lyford east through the county before ending at FM 1420 in Willamar. It has an interchange with I-69E/US 77 just southeast of downtown Lyford.

FM 498 was designated on July 9, 1945, along the current route.

Junction list

FM 499

Farm to Market Road 499 (FM 499) is located in Hunt and Hopkins counties. It runs from Spur 302 in Greenville to I-30 near Cumby. There are concurrencies with SH 24 and I-30's frontage road. In addition to Greenville, the highway passes through the towns of Campbell and Cumby.

FM 819 was also cancelled and transferred to SH 50.

Junction list

FM 499 (1945)

On November 20, 1951, FM 499 was extended east to the Lampasas county line. FM 499 was cancelled on December 13, 1951, and combined with FM 580.

Notes

References

+04
Farm to market roads 0300
Farm to Market Roads 0300